Marywil (from French Ville de Marie) was a large commercial centre and a palace in Warsaw, occupying roughly the place where the Grand Theatre stands today.

History

Marywil was built some time between 1692 and 1697 by Maria Kazimiera, the Queen of Poland, to commemorate the victory of her husband, King John III of Poland over the Turks in the Battle of Vienna. A large, pentagonal baroque building was designed by Tylman Gamerski and modelled after Place des Vosges and Place Dauphine in Paris. The building, bearing strong resemblance to Spanish baroque town market squares, contained shops and houses of the merchants, while the central square was used as a marketplace. The small apartments with depots were leased to foreign merchants who competed with local tradesmen. The northern edge of the complex housed a chapel to the Holy Mother of Victories. The building also served as a royal residence. 

In 1738 the complex was bought by the Załuski family and it was there that Józef Jędrzej Załuski started the famous Załuski Library. Around 1744 the building was converted into a monastery by Antonina Zamoyska. In 1807 four large houses were built in the former marketplace. Between 1817 and 1821 Chrystian Piotr Aigner reconstructed the eastern wing in accordance with contemporary styles and added a seven story high clock tower. Simultaneously, in 1819 the monastery was moved out of the complex and it was converted into a housing quarter. However, soon afterwards, in 1825-1833 the entire complex was demolished to make way for the new Grand Theatre constructed there.

See also 
 Marymont
 Kazanowski Palace
 Marie Casimire Louise de La Grange d'Arquien

References

General:

External links 
  www.warszawa1939.pl
  Marywil Complex by Tylman van Gameren
  Church in Marywil by Tylman van Gameren

Buildings and structures completed in 1697
Palaces in Warsaw
Royal residences in Poland
Baroque palaces in Poland
1697 establishments in the Polish–Lithuanian Commonwealth
Former palaces in Poland